Alicia may refer to:

People 
 Alicia (given name), list of people with this name

 Alisha (singer) (born 1968), US pop singer
 Melinda Padovano (born 1987), a professional wrestler, known by her ring name, Alicia

Places
 Alicia, Bohol, Philippines
 Alicia, Isabela, Philippines
 Alicia, Zamboanga Sibugay, Philippines
 Alicia, Arkansas, United States

Biology
 Alicia (sea anemone), a genus of sea anemones in the family Aliciidae
 Alicia (plant), a genus of plants in the family Malpighiaceae
 Drosera aliciae, carnivorous plant native to South Africa of the family Droseraceae

Others 
 Alicia (album), a 2020 album by Alicia Keys
 Alicia (film), a 1974 Dutch film
 Alicia (submarine), 6-seater submarine
 Alicia's Diary, short story by Thomas Hardy
 Hurricane Alicia, devastating hurricane in 1983

See also
 Alisha
 Alycia